Pose is a contemporary American artist living and working in Chicago, Illinois.

Biography
Pose makes traditional fine art, murals, sculptures, as well as graffiti. He has been featured in multiple issues of Juxtapoz Art & Culture Magazine and is known for "bubbling colors, the hidden characters, the insane detailing and intricate design in his graffiti." Shepard Fairey has described his work as “a hybrid of the aesthetics of pop art, graffiti, sign painting and comics that are all areas of his interest done in his own style.” In 2013, with Revok, he painted a mural in the Bowery. He is listed as on CNN’s 'Ones to Watch' in 2014.{[

Solo exhibitions
2015
Work in Progress, WIP Gallery, Los Angeles, CA
Bold Notion, Core Club, New York, NY

2014
Lemonade, Library Street Collective, Detroit, MI
Public Matter, The Belt, Detroit, MI
Volta w/ Jonathan Levine Gallery, New York, NY

2012
White Wash, Known Gallery, Los Angeles, CA

2010
Rumble, Known Gallery, Los Angeles, CA

Selected Duo Exhibitions
2016
Pose & Mel Ramos, Art Wynwood with Galerie Ernst Hilger, Miami, FL

2014
Pose & Revok, The Mine with Library Street Collective, Dubai, UAE

2013
Pose & Revok, uphill both ways, Jonathan Levine Gallery, New York, NY

References

External links 

 POSE Homepage

1980 births
Living people
American graffiti artists
American contemporary artists